XHAWL-FM is a radio station in Jacala de Ledezma and is part of the Radio y Televisión de Hidalgo state network. It broadcasts on 91.1 MHz.

The station signed on in the early 1980s as XEAWL-AM 1300.

References

Radio stations in Hidalgo (state)